Lümanda Parish was a municipality in Saare County, Estonia. It had a population of 876 (as of 1 January 2007) and covered an area of 199.49 km² (77.02 mi²).
In 2014, it was merged with the municipalities of Kärla and Kaarma to become the Lääne-Saare municipality.

Villages
Atla - Austla - Eeriksaare - Himmiste - Jõgela - Karala - Kärdu - Kipi - Koimla - Koki - Koovi - Kotlandi - Kulli - Kuusnõmme - Leedri - Lümanda - Metsapere - Mõisaküla - Põlluküla - Riksu - Taritu - Vahva - Vana-Lahetaguse - Varpe - Viidu

References

Former municipalities of Estonia